Confessions of a Dangerous Mind may refer to:

Confessions of a Dangerous Mind, a 1984 autobiography by Chuck Barris
Confessions of a Dangerous Mind (film), a 2002 film adaptation of the book
Confessions of a Dangerous Mind (album), the fifth studio album by rapper Logic
"Confessions of a Dangerous Mind" (song), the second single and title track from the album